Burghfield Bridge is a hamlet in the civil parish of Burghfield, which stands to the south of it in the English county of Berkshire. The settlement is situated between the village of Burghfield and the Reading suburb of Southcote.

History

The bridge
The hamlet is so-called due to the bridge crossing the River Kennet (now part of the Kennet and Avon Canal). The river was first crossed in the area in the thirteenth century by the Lord of the Manor, Matthew. The original Burghfield Bridge was built by the De Burghfield family, but they had arguments with King Edward I over who should repair it. There was a minor skirmish there after the First Battle of Newbury in 1643. The current bridge was built c.1812 and is a Grade II listed structure.

World War II
In the early Part of World War II, several anti-invasion measures were installed across the borough, including a fortified house at Burghfield Bridge. Iverne House is situated 100m to the south of the Bridge and was originally a stables. This was converted into a two-storey shell-proof infantry strongpoint around 1941/42. There are gun ports clearly visible from the main Burghfield to Reading Road. The building was converted to a private dwelling in 1994

Business
Burghfield Bridge is the location of Keynote Studios, a recording studio used by, among others, The Race.

There is a disused water mill, Burghfield Mill, located alongside the River Kennet, to the west of Burghfield Bridge, now converted to residential apartments. Burghfield Lock is nearby on the Kennet and Avon Canal.

Local legend
Burghfield Bridge is involved in the local legend of the Cunning Man.  Various stories exist regarding the legend, citing the Cunning Man as a wizard from nearby Tadley, who was able to heal both ailments and broken relationships.  Another explanation is that a local building (now the Peter Pan Café) was built by a cunning man using bricks placed on their sides - so to use less building materials. The story lends its name to the local pub.

Transport
Burghfield Bridge is served by Reading Buses routes 2, 2a and 2b. The hamlet is located near to Reading services on the M4 motorway, although the nearest access point to the road is at junction 11,  to the south-east.

References

External links
 Royal Berkshire History: Burghfield

Hamlets in Berkshire
Bridges in Berkshire
Burghfield